Ted Morgan (born March 30, 1932) is a French–American biographer, journalist, and historian.

Life
Morgan was born Count Sanche Charles Armand Gabriel de Gramont in Geneva.

He is the son of Gabriel Antoine Armand, Count de Gramont (1908–1943), a pilot in the French escadrille in England during World War II. Gramont is an old French noble family.  

His father was the son of the 11th Duke of Gramont and his third wife, Maria of the Princes Ruspoli.

After his father's death in a training flight, Morgan began to lead two parallel lives. 
He attended Yale University (where he was a member of Manuscript Society) and worked as a reporter. 
But he was still a member (albeit a reluctant one) of the French nobility. 
He was drafted into the French Army where he served for two years from 1955 to 1957, during the Algerian War, initially as a second lieutenant with a Senegalese regiment of Colonial Infantry and then as a propaganda officer. 
He subsequently wrote in frank detail of his brutalizing experiences while on active service in the bled (Algerian countryside) and of the atrocities committed by both sides during the Battle of Algiers.

Following his military service, Morgan returned to the United States and won the Pulitzer Prize for Local Reporting, Edition Time in 1961 for what was described as "his moving account of the death of Leonard Warren on the Metropolitan Opera stage." At the time,  Morgan was still a French citizen writing under the name of "Sanche de Gramont".

In the 1970s, Morgan stopped using the byline "Sanche de Gramont". He became an American citizen in 1977, renouncing his titles of nobility. The name he adopted as a U.S. citizen, "Ted Morgan", is an anagram of "de Gramont". The new name was a conscious attempt to discard his aristocratic French past. He had settled on a "name that conformed with the language and cultural norms of American society, a name that telephone operators and desk clerks could hear without flinching" (On Becoming American, 1978). Morgan was featured in the CBS news program 60 Minutes in 1978. The segment explored Morgan's reasons for embracing American culture.

Morgan has written biographies of William S. Burroughs, Franklin Delano Roosevelt and Winston Churchill. The last-named was a finalist in the 1983 Pulitzer Prize for Biography. His 1980 biography of W. Somerset Maugham was a 1982 National Book Award finalist in its first paperback edition. He has also written for newspapers and magazines.

Selected books
 
 
; Random House Digital, Inc., 2011,  
 
 
Wilderness at Dawn: The Settling of the North American Continent Simon & Schuster, 1993,  
An Uncertain Hour: The French, the Germans, the Jews, the Barbie Trial, and the City of Lyon, 1940–1945 (1990)
 
FDR: A Biography, Simon & Schuster, 1985,  
Churchill: A Young Man in A Hurry, Simon & Schuster, 1982; Simon & Schuster, 1984,  
Rowing toward Eden, Houghton Mifflin, 1981,  
Maugham Simon & Schuster, 1980,  
On Becoming American Houghton Mifflin, 1978
The Strong Brown God: The Story of the Niger River, Hart Davis, MacGibbon, 1975 (as Sanche de Gramont)
Lives To Give (1971) (as Sanche de Gramont)
Epitaph for kings  Putnam, 1968 (as Sanche de Gramont)
The French: Portrait of a people (1969) (as Sanche de Gramont)
The Secret War: The story of international espionage since 1945 (1962) (as Sanche de Gramont)

Notes

References

External links

C-SPAN Q&A interview with Morgan, February 21, 2010
  (including books by Sanche de Gramont)

1932 births
Living people
American male journalists
Yale University alumni
Pulitzer Prize winners for journalism
Writers from Geneva
French emigrants to the United States
French military personnel of the Algerian War
20th-century French writers
21st-century French non-fiction writers
20th-century American historians
21st-century American historians
21st-century American male writers
20th-century American biographers
21st-century American biographers
French male non-fiction writers
20th-century American male writers
American male biographers
American male non-fiction writers